Alison Joan Tierney  FRCN (born 4 May 1948) is a British nursing theorist, nurse researcher and former editor-in-chief of the Journal of Advanced Nursing. Tierney was one of the first  graduates (1971) of the Integrated Degree/Nursing programme at The University of Edinburgh. In 2018 she was named as one of 70 of the most influential nurses in the 70 years of the NHS (National Health Service).

Education 
Tierney is a Registered Nurse with a Bachelor of Science (Social Sciences - Nursing) and a PhD in nursing from The University of Edinburgh.

Career 
She became one of the earliest British nurses in 1976 to complete a doctoral degree in a university department, sponsored by a government grant and went on to lead a research-based career  and became a senior academic nurse leader. In 1976, together with colleagues Nancy Roper, and Winifred W. Logan, and founded on the work of Virginia Henderson, she developed the 'activities of living'  nursing care model commonly referred to as the Roper–Logan–Tierney model of nursing. New editions were published in 1985, 1990 and 1996 and, with translation into many languages, it became well known around the world and of particular interest in some European centres, for example in the nursing school of the University of Heidelberg which had implemented nursing theories from the US as early as 1953.  Roper, Logan and Tierney’s model has underpinned much nursing practice in the UK and beyond and  its use and evaluation was reviewed by the authors in a final monograph published in 2000. She worked in Edinburgh with Annie Altschul. In 1980, with Roper and Logan, she published The Elements of Nursing. This nursing model became the basis for the activities in daily life care model in European centres led by Juchli and  further developed by Monika Krohwinkel. Activities of Living care research was reviewed and updated by the authors through 2000 and, for example, the nursing school of the University of Heidelberg implementing nursing theories from the US and the UK as early as 1953, has included the theory of Roper, Logan and Tierney.

Tierney first joined the staff of the Department of Nursing Studies at The University of Edinburgh as a lecturer and eventually received a Personal Chair in Nursing Research in October 1997. For a 10-year period she was Director of their government-funded Nursing Research Unit. After a final period as Head of Nursing Studies, Tierney left in 2002 to join the University of Adelaide in South Australia as Professor and Head of the Department of Clinical Nursing, and as Director of the South Australian Center of The Joanna Briggs Institute at the Royal Adelaide Hospital. She remains affiliated to the University of Adelaide as an adjunct professor.

Tierney has held various other appointments and has served on many national and international committees. She represented the Royal College of Nursing from 1990 to 1997 in the Workgroup of European Nursing Researchers. She acted as an expert adviser on nursing research with Prof Bill Holzemer (UCLA) to the International Council of Nurses in 1996 and in 1997 co-chaired with Dr P Grady (National Institute of Nursing Research) the expert group convened by the International Council of Nurses to formulate ‘Priorities for the International Nursing Research Agenda’. She served on the Nursing panel in the UK 2001 Research Exercise Assessment Exercise. She chaired an international panel in 2002-3 for a national evaluation of nursing research in Finland conducted by the Academy of Finland. In 2003, she became Editor-in-Chief of the Journal of Advanced Nursing. She has held visiting professor appointments at various universities, including  King’s College London and the Fudan University in Shanghai, China. For five years (2006-2011) she was a Non-Executive Director of NHS Lothian. She has undertaken consultancies for UK Nursing Schools’ preparations for the 2014 and the 2021 Research Excellence Framework.

Recognition 

Tierney is a Fellow (1995) of the Royal College of Nursing. For her achievements in the field of nursing research and education she was appointed a CBE in 2002. She has received honorary doctoral degrees from Edinburgh Napier University in 2004, the University of Turku in Finland in 2006, Queen Margaret University in 2011 and in July 2018 the University of Edinburgh awarded her the honorary degree of Doctor honoris causa.

Publications

References

External links 

 

Scottish nurses
Academics of the University of Edinburgh
Nursing theory
Alumni of the University of Edinburgh
Academic staff of the University of Adelaide
Commanders of the Order of the British Empire
Royal College of Nursing
Nursing researchers
Living people
1948 births
Academic journal editors
Fellows of the Royal College of Nursing
British nurses